Olga Zaitseva (born 12 March 1962) is a former competitor for the Soviet Union at the 1979, 1980, 1981 and 1983 editions of the Federation Cup. Despite posting doubles victories over top professionals such as Betty Stöve, Hana Mandlíková and Renáta Tomanová, Zaitseva did not compete at any point on the women's professional tennis circuit or at any of the Grand Slams and thus never attained a world ranking.

Career finals

Doubles (3-0)

References

External links 

1962 births
Living people
Soviet female tennis players
Universiade medalists in tennis
Universiade silver medalists for the Soviet Union
Universiade bronze medalists for the Soviet Union